Yonpo Airfield(련포비행장), also known as Yonpo Air Base or K-27 Air Base, is an airport near Hamhung, South Hamgyong Province, North Korea.

History

Korean War

On 2 July 1950 the 19th Bombardment Group launched a strike on Yonpo Airfield based on faulty intelligence there were 65 Korean People's Air Force (KPAF) aircraft there, but only 16 KPAF aircraft were in the field, none of which were damaged by the airstrike. On 19 July carrier aircraft of Task Force 77 attacked Yonpo destroying 15 aircraft.

The Yonpo area was captured by the 5th and 7th Marine Regiments advancing from Wonsan on 30 October 1950 and the airfield was put into service by the UN forces. The USAF designated the base K-27. The 35th Fighter-Interceptor Group moved to the base on 18 November and was joined by the Marine Aircraft Group 12 on 1 December, both provided close air support to the U. S. Army X Corps and the 1st U.S. Marine Division surrounded at the Battle of Chosin Reservoir. X Corps established a casualty clearing and evacuation station at Yonpo for casualties evacuated from the Chosin.

USAF units based there included:
35th Fighter-Interceptor Group from 18 November-7 December 1950, units attached included:
39th Fighter-Interceptor Squadron operating F-51Ds
40th Fighter-Interceptor Squadron operating F-51Ds
339th Fighter-Interceptor Squadron operating F-82Gs
437th Troop Carrier Wing operating C-46s
6150th Tactical Support Wing from 27 November-1 December 1950

USMC units based there included:
Marine Aircraft Group 12 from 1–17 December 1950, units attached included:
VMF-212 operating F4Us until 7 December 1950
VMF-311 operating F-9Fs from 10 to 14 December 1950
VMO-6 operating OYs and HO3S'

UN units based there included:
No. 77 Squadron RAAF operating F-51Ds attached to the 35th Fighter-Interceptor Group

Following the successful retreat from the Chosin Reservoir, US Marines of Regimental Combat Teams 5 and 7 prepared a defensive line around Yonpo on 9 December, however General Douglas MacArthur ordered the withdrawal of X Corps to South Korea. General MacArthur met with General Edward Almond at Yonpo on 11 December and approved the X Corps evacuation plan. From 14 to 17 December USAF Combat Cargo Command moved 228 patients, 3,891 passengers, and 20,088 tons of cargo from Yonpo. The aerial evacuation from Yonpo continued until 17 December when the field was closed and operations were moved to a temporary field at Hungnam harbour.

Postwar
The KPAF continues to use the base and several squadrons of Antonov An-2s appear to be based there.

See also
Battle of the Chosin Reservoir
Pyongyang Air Base
Pyongyang East Air Base (K-24)

References 

Airports in North Korea
Korean War air bases